The Snellius class are two hydrographic survey vessel (HOV) ships in service with the hydrographic branch of the Royal Netherlands Navy. The ships were built by the Damen Group, with the hull being built in Romania by Damen Shipyards Galați and the fitting out in the Netherlands by Damen Schelde Naval Shipbuilding.

The current Snellius is the third hydrographic vessel with this name, being named after the mathematician Willebrord Snellius. Named after the hydrographer Johan Lambertus Hendrikus Luymes, the Luymes is also the third hydrographic vessel with this name although the first ship never entered service.

Design and description
The ships are powered by a diesel-electric system composed of two Caterpillar Acert diesel generators producing . The generators produce enough electricity to also cover the ships hotel loads.

Ships in class

Construction and career
On 25 June 2002 construction officially started for both ships with a keel laying ceremony at the Galați shipyard on behalf of Damen Schelde Naval Shipbuilding. This marked the first occasion of a Dutch naval ship to be partly built in Romania. A year later Snellius arrived in Vlissingen for fitting out.

On 14 July 2021 it was announced that the mid-life update of Snellius was completed by Damen. Work included the replacement or complete overhaul of various systems including SEWACO systems. The maintenance period lasted about a year. Luymes underwent the same maintenance and modernisation work a year earlier.

The builder of the new ships will be selected in 2024.
 See Auxiliary ship replacement program for more information.

Citations

External links

 Snellius-class at defensie.nl
 Snellius at defensie.nl
 Luymes at defensie.nl

Snellius-class hydrographic survey vessels
Survey ships
Auxiliary ships of the Royal Netherlands Navy